Bagh (also Romanized as Bāgh) is a village in Sahray-ye Bagh Rural District, Sahray-ye Bagh District, Larestan County, Fars Province, Iran. At the 2006 census, its population was 1,236, in 230 families.

References 

Populated places in Larestan County